Aidar may refer to:

 Aidar (river), in Ukraine and Russia
 Aidar Battalion, a Ukrainian military unit established in 2014
 Aidar Kazov (born 1995), Kazakh weightlifter

See also
 Aydar (disambiguation)